Carrick is a civil parish in County Westmeath, Ireland.

Carrick is one of 10 civil parishes in the barony of Fartullagh in the Province of Leinster.

Carrick civil parish comprises 6 townlands: Brackagh, Carrick, Gaddaghanstown, Higginstown, Robinstown and Walterstown.

The neighbouring civil parishes are: Moylisker to the north, Kilbride to the east and Castlelost and Clonfad to the south.

The N52 road passes through the parish approximately from south to north.

References

External links
Carricke civil parish at the IreAtlas Townland Data Base
Carrick civil parish at townlands.ie
Carrick civil parish at the Placenames Database of Ireland

Civil parishes of County Westmeath